The Story of My Life, first published in book form in 1903, is Helen Keller's autobiography detailing her early life, particularly her experiences with Anne Sullivan. Portions of it were adapted by William Gibson for a 1957 Playhouse 90 production, a 1959 Broadway play, a 1962 Hollywood feature film, and the Indian film Black. The book is dedicated to inventor Alexander Graham Bell, who was one of her teachers and an advocate for the deaf.

Publication history
HELEN KELLER began to write The Story of My Life in 1902, while she was still a student at Radcliffe College. It was published in the Ladies' Home Journal that same year as a series of installments. The following year, it was published by Doubleday, Page & Co. as a book. The book was well received.

References

External links

 
The Story of My Life at Internet Archive (scanned books original editions color illustrated)

Alabama culture
American autobiographies
1903 non-fiction books
Helen Keller
Biographies adapted into films
Literature about blindness
Literature about blind people
Literature about deaf people